Electric motors have a long history going back to the early nineteenth century.

Nineteenth century

Twentieth century

References

Electric motors